Dhirendranath Datta (2 November 1886 – disappeared 29 March 1971)
was a Bengali lawyer by profession who was also active in the politics of undivided Bengal in pre-partition India, and later in East Pakistan (1947–1971).

Early life
Datta was born on 2 November 1886 in Ramrail, in Brahmanbaria District, Bengal Province (in today's Bangladesh). His father Jagabandhu Datta was a lawyer and introduced Dhirendranath to the legal profession from an early age. Dhirendranath was educated at Nabinagar High School, Comilla Zilla School and Ripon College in Calcutta.

Early career
Datta began his career as a school teacher, eventually becoming assistant headmaster of the Bangora High school in Comilla. He was very active in the local community and was a leader of the relief effort following devastating floods in 1915. He formed the Mukti Sangha, a welfare organization, after becoming inspired by Mahatma Gandhi. Datta's relief work continued up to the Bengal Famine of 1943. He joined the Comilla District Bar in 1911 and continued to practice until he was advised to give up his profession in favor of politics by his political comrade Chittaranjan Das.

Political activism
Along with many politically active Bengalis of his time, Datta took a firm stand following the Bengal Partition of 1905. He chose to vehemently oppose partition, working closely with other anti-partition activists such as Surendranath Banerjee and Rabindranath Tagore. Datta joined the Indian National Congress from Mymensingh District and was first elected to the Bengal Legislative Council in 1937. He was arrested by the British rulers of India for his participation in the Quit India movement of 1942.

Datta firmly opposed the creation of Pakistan and partition of India on religious lines; but when it became clear that partition of Bengal was inevitable and that his home district of Comilla would be in the new Muslim majority state, he opted to remain in East Bengal (unlike many other Hindu leaders), and as a result, was invited to be part of the constitutional committee to draft the legislative framework of the new country before the actual independence of Pakistan.

The Pakistan era
Datta continued to represent his constituency as a Hindu member of the renamed Pakistan National Congress (seats were allocated by a quota according to religion). On 23 February 1948 in the Pakistan Constituent Assembly in Karachi, he made a speech calling for Bengali to be made one of the official languages of Pakistan, in what was to become the action he will be most remembered for by his compatriots.

In 1954, he moved an adjournment motion against the declaration of Governor's Rule in East Pakistan, and was seen as the de facto face of protest and democracy.

He served as the Minister of Health and Social Welfare (East Pakistan) in Ataur Rahman Khan's cabinet (1956. because of his alleged links to the emerging underground Bengali Nationalist movement, supposed members of which included Sheikh Mujibur Rahman. After this, he refrained from active politics but kept on supporting the rising nationalist movement from behind.

Assassination by the Pakistan Army
Due to Datta's continued defiance of state discrimination and authoritarianism in Pakistan, at the onset of the Bangladesh Liberation War, three days after the arrest of Sheikh Mujibur Rahman, Datta was arrested at his house in Comilla on 29 March 1971, and taken with his son, Dilip Kumar Datta, to Moynamoti Cantonment and tortured to death. For this reason, he is often referred to as "Shaheed" (martyr) as a sign of respect.

Personal life
Datta had a son Dilip Kumar Datta.

References

Further reading
 Article on the history of the Bangladesh Language Movement

1886 births
1971 deaths
Bangladeshi Hindus
Bengali language activists
Pakistani Hindus
Surendranath College alumni
University of Calcutta alumni
People from Comilla District
People killed in the Bangladesh Liberation War
Assassinated Bangladeshi politicians
Recipients of the Independence Day Award
Pakistani torture victims
People from Comilla
Pakistani MNAs 1947–1954
Surendranath Law College alumni
1971 murders in Bangladesh
History of East Pakistan
Members of the Constituent Assembly of Pakistan